Gheyb-e Elahi (also Romanized as Gheyb-e Elahī and Gheib Elahi; also known as Ghaib ‘Alai, Gheyb‘alī, and Gheybollāhī) is a village in Alamarvdasht Rural District, Alamarvdasht District, Lamerd County, Fars Province, Iran. At the 2006 census, its population was 669, in 124 families.

References 

Populated places in Lamerd County